An urban Indian reserve is land that the Government of Canada has designated as a First Nations reserve that is situated within an urban area. Such lands allow for aboriginal commercial ventures which enjoy the tax exemptions offered to traditional reserves. They may be located within either a municipality or, in the case of Saskatchewan, a Northern Administration District.

An urban reserve may result from either encroachment of a municipal area into existing reserve lands, or from the designation of land in an existing urban territory.

Some commercial urban reserves exist as satellites to rural reserves. It has been suggested that the generated revenue will help maintain the economic well-being of the associated rural community.

History

The first such reserve was established in 1981 at Kylemore, Saskatchewan as operated by the Fishing Lake First Nation (Treaty 4). Another urban reserve under the Peter Ballantyne Cree Nation (Treaty 6) followed at Prince Albert in 1982.

It is argued that the first formal commercial urban reserve was a property of  established within Saskatoon in 1988 for the Muskeg Lake Cree Nation. By 2004, the reserve's commercial activity grew to provide employment for 350 people under 37 businesses, today known as the McKnight Commercial Centre.

The Treaty Land Entitlement Framework Agreement (TLEFA) was signed on 9 September 1992 to settle unresolved treaty land claims for 28 First Nation groups in Saskatchewan. Article 9 of this accord provides a mechanism for First Nations groups to contract with municipal governments to allow designation of certain properties as reserves.

At least four urban reserves are also established in Manitoba. One of these, situated north of Winnipeg under the auspices of the Roseau River Anishinabe First Nation (Treaty 1), includes a gas station and a tobacco retailer with plans to include a medical facility and larger operations such as automobile retail.

Opinions
Critics such as the Canadian Taxpayers Federation are concerned that such reserves are entitled to exemptions from taxation that other businesses in a community do not enjoy. Furthermore, there are complications in disposing of urban reserve lands which require approval of the operating First Nation, and that reserve lands would revert to federal government control. Other critics such as the Frontier Centre for Public Policy concede that urban reserves have benefits, but wish the abolishment of the reserve system and other racially based policies as a whole.

Proponents of urban reserves note that these encourage a diverse land base which provides business opportunities for First Nations people. It is also claimed that there are advantages to the surrounding community due to spin-off business activity which contributes favourably to those outside the reserve.

Examples

Examples include:
 Capilano Indian Reserve No.5, inside Vancouver
 Enoch Cree Nation 135, which borders Edmonton
 Kitsilano Indian Reserve No.6, inside Vancouver
 Mission Indian Reserve No.6, which borders North Vancouver
 Tsuu T'ina Nation 145, Alberta, which borders Calgary
 Membertou First Nation, inside Sydney, Nova Scotia (Cape Breton Regional Municipality)
 Cole Harbour 30, inside Cole Harbour, Nova Scotia (Halifax Regional Municipality)
 St. Mary's First Nation, inside Fredericton
 Long Plain 6B, Manitoba, which borders Portage la Prairie
 Long Plain 6C, Manitoba, inside Winnipeg
 Wendake, an enclave surrounded by Quebec City
 Kahnawake, Quebec, which borders Montreal, Quebec

See also
Urban Māori
Urban Indian

External links
 CBC article 'Demystifying urban reserves' https://www.cbc.ca/news/canada/manitoba/demystifying-urban-reserves-1.2993051

  Opinion item which advocates urban reserves for Ottawa, Ontario.

References

Business parks of Canada
 
Urban geography
Ethnic enclaves in Canada